Mud, Sweat, and Tears: The Autobiography is a 2011 autobiography written by Northern Irish adventurer, writer and television presenter Bear Grylls. It is the eleventh book published by Grylls.

Overview
Grylls' autobiography details his life before his career as the host of Man vs. Wild, focusing on his childhood, growing up on the Isle of Wight, and other times in Grylls' early life.

Mud, Sweat, and Tears was named one of the best autobiographies for children and teenagers to read by The Guardian. In 2012, the book was voted “the most influential book in China.”

References

External links
Mud, Sweat, and Tears on Amazon

2011 non-fiction books
British autobiographies
Transworld Publishers books